Nafulsella turpanensis is a Gram-negative and rod-shaped bacterium from the genus Nafulsella, which has been isolated from soil from the Xinjiang province in China.

References

External links
Type strain of Nafulsella turpanensis at BacDive -  the Bacterial Diversity Metadatabase

Cytophagia
Bacteria described in 2013